The Northern Levant is a region in the Eastern Mediterranean, part of the wider region of the Levant, going south as far as the Litani River.

In archaeology, the Northern Levant can be defined as the northern section of what in Arabic is called "bilad al-sham, 'the land of sham [Syria]'", in other terms the northern part of greater Syria. The Oxford Handbook of the Archaeology of the Levant: c. 8000–332 BCE (OHAL; 2013) defines its boundaries, for the specific purposes of the book, as follows.
 To the north: the Taurus Mountains or the Plain of 'Amuq
 To the east: the eastern deserts, i.e. (from north to south) the Euphrates and the Jebel el-Bishrī area for the northern Levant, followed by the Syrian Desert east of the eastern hinterland of the Anti-Lebanon range (whose southernmost part is Mount Hermon), also known as the Badia region. In other words, Mesopotamia and the North Arabian Desert.
 To the south: the Litani River, which marks the boundary towards the Southern Levant.
 To the west: the Mediterranean Sea

See also
History of Syria
History of Lebanon
Archaeology of Lebanon

References

Bibliography

 

Levant
Geographical regions